The Hero System (or HERO System) is a generic role-playing game system that developed from the superhero RPG Champions. This page lists all the products published for use with this role-playing system.

Product types

Publishers and gamers classify HERO System products into a few types of books:

 Rulebook:  Provides some version of the HERO System rules engine.
 Rules Supplement:  Provides new or optional rules (for the game system as a whole, or a particular setting), but not the core rules engine itself.
 Genre Book: Covers creating and running games in a particular genre using the HERO System.
 Subgenre Book:  Like a Genre Book, but focusing on a narrower segment of the full genre.
 Campaign Setting:  Describes a fictional world and/or provides parameters for a campaign.
 Setting Expansion: Offers more detail on an existing Campaign Setting, such as detailing a single city or country within a larger fictional world.
 Creature Book: Describes general monsters, animals, or similar classes of characters. For example, it might include "demons" or "vampires," but not a specific demon or vampire.
 Enemies Book: Details specific adversaries for use in adventures (villains & villain teams, individually named monsters and antagonists, etc.).
 Characters Book: Contains specific characters (like an Enemies Book), but not necessarily adversaries (allies, supporting characters, etc.).
 Organization Book: Details the structure and workings of one or more organizations (companies, agencies, criminal empires, and so on).
 Adventure Book: Outlines one or more pre-prepared adventure scenarios.
 Powers Book: Offers pre-defined powers, spells, or the like.
 Equipment Book: Details pre-defined gear of one or more kinds. 
 Playing Aid: Game-assistance material such as GM screens.

HERO System genres

Players typically refer to various story genres by the name of the HERO System genre book most prominently or most recently associated with it as follows:

 Champions: Comic-book style superheroes.  This is the genre most closely associated with the HERO System, and was also the title of the first HERO System game in 1981.  Many players call the game system itself by the name "Champions," or consider that name interchangeable with the term "HERO System."
 Fantasy Hero: Fantasy adventure typically featuring wizards, swordsmen, kings, quests, dragons, prophecies, and so on.
 Star Hero: Science-Fiction and other futuristic settings.
 Pulp Hero: Action-Adventure in the style of the 1920s-1930s pulp adventure magazines (flying aces, daring archaeologists, Nazis, masked men, gangsters, mad scientists, and so on).
 Dark Champions: Modern-day Action Adventure such as non-superpowered vigilantes, military or law enforcement, international espionage, etc.
 Horror Hero: Stories played for fright, usually featuring normal people facing (or fleeing) supernatural evil or other Things Man Was Not Meant To Know.
 Ninja Hero: Martial Arts adventure in the vein of wuxia cinema and similar tales.
 Cyber Hero: Near-future (often dystopian) stories typically spotlighting the convergence of humanity and technology.
 Post-Apocalyptic Hero: Adventure in worlds after the fall of an earlier civilization.
 Western Hero: Sixguns and sheriffs in the American Wild West.
 Robot Warriors: Anime-style Mecha adventure.
 The Widening Gyre: Steampunk adventure.

See also
 Hero System
 Hero Games

Notes

External links 
Hero Games

Hero System
Hero System
Hero System